Transformers Revenge of the Fallen: Decepticons is an action-adventure game based on the 2009 live action film Transformers: Revenge of the Fallen. It is the Nintendo DS port of Transformers: Revenge of the Fallen, but follows a different storyline and focuses exclusively on the Decepticons. It was developed by Vicarious Visions alongside Transformers Revenge of the Fallen: Autobots, which follows the Autobots; the two games share some basic similarities, but overall feature different characters, missions and locations. Both games were published by Activision in June 2009, and received mixed reviews.

Gameplay

As with Transformers: The Game, the DS version of Revenge of the Fallen splits the Autobot and Decepticon campaigns into two different games. The two games feature 25 missions in total, and the ability to battle friends via the handheld's Nintendo Wi-Fi Connection. Similar to Transformers Decepticons, players must customize their own Transformer, known as "Create-A-Bot", who can be furthered customized during the game using parts found in missions. The difference between this game and its predecessors is that while scanning a vehicle to choose an alternate form, players are limited to "light" vehicles, which are fast but weak, "medium" vehicles, which are fast and strong, and "heavy" vehicles, which are strong but slow, and the protoform can't scan another vehicle once one has been already chosen. Another addition is that multiple weapons, armor and upgrades can be found throughout the game.

Synopsis

Characters 
Similar to the first set of Transformers games for the DS, the player gets to create their own character which they play as throughout the campaign.  Many of the main Transformers from the movie appear throughout the story to aid the player, and several are available to play as in challenges.
Create-A-Bot: The player character, who is depicted as a Transformer having just recently arrived on Earth and joined the Decepticons.
The Fallen (voiced by James Arnold Taylor): A former Prime and the first Decepticon, as well as their supreme ruler. Though unplayable, he is seen in the last mission of the game.
Megatron (voiced by Frank Welker): The deceased leader of the Decepticons, who becomes The Fallen's right-hand disciple upon being revived by his minions. He can transform into a Cybertronian flying tank, and is only playable in challenge missions.
Starscream (voiced by Charlie Adler): The Decepticons' second-in-command and temporary leader, in Megatron's absence. He is playable in the tutorial in robot form, and in a few story and challenge missions in his Lockheed Martin F-22 Raptor jet form.
Soundwave (voiced by Peter Jessop): The Decepticons' tech genius and a Transformer of few words. Though unplayable, he makes several appearances throughout the game, and gives the player useful hints.
Grindor: (voiced by Fred Tatasciore): A Decepticon lieutenant who transforms into a Sikorsky MH-53 Pave Low helicopter; he looks identical to Blackout from the previous game, and they may be the same character. Though unplayable, he appears in several story missions.
Sideways: (voiced by John DiMaggio): A Decepticon lieutenant and a relatively recent addition to the Decepticon forces on Earth. He can transform into an Audi R8, and is only playable in challenge missions.
Barricade: A Decepticon lieutenant who transforms into a Ford Mustang Saleen S281E police car. He is only playable in challenge missions.
Devastator: A massive Decepticon made out of six regular-sized ones, known as the "Constructicons". Though unplayable, he is seen in the background of the last mission of the game.
Scorponok: Grindor's minion resembling a scorpion. Though he doesn't appear in the game, he is featured as a mini-boss in the last mission of the Autobots game; here, the boss fight against Scorponok is replaced with that against a NEST helicopter.
Reedman, Ravage, Demolishor, and Scalpel are only mentioned in the game and, therefore, unplayable.

Plot
After being informed of Soundwave about Create-A-Bot crashing on Earth in Brazil, Starscream tracks him down and introduces himself as the Decepticon leader, persuading the newly arrived Transformer to join the Decepticons. They are then attacked by a group of Autobots, led by Optimus Prime, but manage to escape, and Create-A-Bot chooses one out of three human vehicles as his alternate form. After destroying several Autobots in the area, including the Create-A-Bot from Transformers Revenge of the Fallen: Autobots, the pair return to the Decepticon base, where Create-A-Bot receives his first task in Eastern Europe: to scan and then destroy several NEST data vehicles that contain Megatron's whereabouts, as well as to help track down an AllSpark shard. He is then transferred to England, where he is ordered to destroy several turrets and the Autobots guarding them, as well as disarm a bomb.

Meanwhile, Grindor and Starscream attack and destroy an oil rig off the coast of England in order to distract NEST and the Autobots, but Grindon takes fire from the oil rig's weaponry, prompting Starscream to pick him up and escape. In Rome, Italy, Create-A-Bot destroys the force fields guarding the NEST UAVs and destroys them with a bomb. He is confronted by the Autobot Bumblebee, who calls in a NEST air strike, but Create-A-Bot hacks into the UAVs and re-directs the bombs, before defeating Bumblebee and escaping. Shortly after, Create-A-Bot travels to Siberia and infiltrates a military base, where he plants tracking device on a helicopter that is on-route to the location of the AllSpark shard. While Soundwave tracks the helicopter, Create-A-Bot heads to a part of Asia to attack a NEST airbase before heading to Japan to destroy several generators in order to weaken the Autobots' defenses. Once he succeeds, he is informed by Soundwave that the shard has been moved to an aircraft carrier on the Indian Ocean. After retrieving it, Create-A-Bot heads to the Laurentian Abyss, where Megatron's body is kept deep underwater. Grindor lowers Create-A-Bot into the water, allowing him to retrieve Megatron's remains and then revive him using the shard. Megatron subsequently assumes command of the Decepticons once again, much to Starscream's frustration.

Megatron then becomes the servant of The Fallen, a former Prime and the first Decepticon, who seeks to harvest the power from the Sun and transform it into enough Energon for the Decepticons to finally destroy the Autobots, using his old Sun Harvester, which will also destroy the Sun and all life on Earth in the process. However, the Decepticons first need to help The Fallen and his forces arrive on Earth undetected, which they do after attacking an Autobot base in Mexico and destroying its satellite defense system. Create-A-Bot meanwhile travels to Canada to gain control of an Autobot refinery while also going to Area 51 to scan Decepticon technology and self-destruct the base by overloading the ballistic missile's controls. The Fallen then orders the Decepticons to retrieve the Autobot Matrix of Leadership, which he needs in order to activate the Sun Harvester. To find it, Create-A-Bot is sent to hunt down The Fallen's former servant Jetfire, but he is protected by Autobots aboard an aircraft carrier. Create-A-Bot manages to board the carrier, where he defeats the Autobot Ironhide, before confronting Jetfire. When he refuses to reveal the Matrix's whereabouts, Create-A-Bot rips Jetfire's spark out of his body, killing him and extracting the information he wanted.

The Decepticons later travel to a NEST base in Arabia to disable the base's satellite dishes, allowing Starscream to send Soundwave a message to attack a depot in South Africa. There, Create-A-Bot destroys several NEST hardware vehicles before they can fully operate the depot, before going to the Sahara to destroy another military base by activating the missile's self-destruct systems after NEST learned of the Decepticons' presence there.

Learning that the Matrix is in Egypt, the Decepticons travel there, and The Fallen unleashes the massive Decepticon Devastator to uncover the Sun Harvester from within a pyramid. Meanwhile, Create-A-Bot is sent to retrieve the Matrix, finding it in the possession of Optimus Prime. After defeating Optimus, he claims the Matrix and returns to The Fallen, informing him of his victory against Optimus, much to both his and Megatron's surprise. The Fallen then has Create-A-Bot replace Megatron as leader of the Decepticons, much to Starscream's joy, and later announces that the harvesting of the Sun was a success, providing the Decepticons with tons of Energon and allowing them to create an army large enough to conquer the known universe. But before all this, Starscream managed to warn Create-A-Bot that he will return to being leader of the Decepticons in the mean future.

Reception

Decepticons was met with average reception upon release, as GameRankings gave it a score of 69%, while Metacritic gave it 66 out of 100.

Nintendo Power gave the game 7 out of 10, stating, "This may be the first time in video game history that a licensed DS title far exceeds the movie it's based on."  IGN gave the game a score of 7 out of 10, stating that it "represents Transformers well".

References

2009 video games
Nintendo DS games
Nintendo DS-only games
Video games based on films
Video games based on adaptations
Revenge Of The Fallen Decepticons
Activision games
Vicarious Visions games
Video games set in the United States
Video games set in Egypt
Video games developed in the United States

fr:Transformers : La Revanche - Decepticons